The 1994 Brisbane Broncos season was the seventh in the club's history. As defending Premiers the Broncos competed in the NSWRL's 1994 Winfield Cup competition, finishing the regular season 5th (out of 16). They then progressed as far as the Semi-finals where a one-point loss to the North Sydney Bears saw them knocked out. Brisbane also hosted and lost the 1994 World Club Challenge to England's Wigan.

Season summary 
In the English spring of 1994 it was announced that the Brisbane Broncos club was buying the London Crusaders, who would be renamed 'London Broncos'.

New South Wales Rugby League season 1994 started in fine fashion for Brisbane. They cruised through to the final of the Tooheys Challenge Cup for the fifth time, but amazingly were pipped by the South Sydney Rabbitohs in the decider. That started a shocking opening to the premiership that saw them win just one game in the first month of the competition and leave them languishing near oblivion. They were flat out winning two games in a row for much of the season.

Behind the scenes, Broncos chief executive John Ribot sent his first report on the Super League concept to News Ltd chief executive Ken Cowley.

On-field Brisbane continued to struggle, with frustration reaching boiling point against the Newcastle Knights. Referee Greg McCallum sinbinned Allan Langer for dissent as the Knights beat the Broncos for the first time. More disappointment came when Wigan avenged their 1992 loss by winning the 1994 World Club Challenge at ANZ Stadium mid-season.

A late season revival catapulted the Broncos into fifth spot, narrowly beating out the Illawarra Steelers for a spot in the finals. A tight contest against Manly-Warringah which resulted in 16-4 victory revived some hope of a 'three-peat'. The following week they played against the North Sydney Bears, and after trailing 14-4 the Broncos staged a comeback to level at 14-14. In the end, a Jason Taylor field goal won the game for North Sydney 15-14 shortly before full-time.

Match results 

 *Game following a State of Origin match

Season Ladder

Scorers

Honours

League 
 Nil

Club 
 Player of the year: Allan Langer
 Rookie of the year: Brad Thorn / John Driscoll
 Back of the year: Michael Hancock
 Forward of the year: Andrew Gee
 Club man of the year: John Plath

References

See also 
 History of the Brisbane Broncos

Brisbane Broncos seasons
Brisbane Broncos season